Matthew Hilger is an American professional poker player and author from Atlanta, Georgia. He also operates his own poker-related website.

Early years

Prior to poker, Hilger graduated from University of Georgia with a Bachelor's degree in Finance (1989) and a Master's degree from Georgia State University in Finance in(1991). He received a second Master's in International business from Thunderbird School of Global Management (1996), then worked for Accenture (then Andersen Consulting) in numerous positions.

Poker career

Hilger became an online poker professional during 2001 and made over $100,000 playing online in his first year, playing limit poker from $1/$2 to $30/$60. At the time he wrote his first book, he had played over 7,000 hours of online poker.

His writings include:
 Internet Texas Hold 'em: Winning Strategies from an Internet Pro
 Texas Hold 'em Odds and Probabilities: Limit, No-limit and Tournament Strategies
 The Poker Mindset: Essential Attitudes for Poker Success (with Ian Taylor)
 Card Player Magazine (numerous articles)
 The Hendon Mob website (numerous articles)

Hilger won the 2002 New Zealand Poker Championship and went on to finish in the money in the World Series of Poker (WSOP) $10,000 no limit Texas hold 'em main event in 2004 (33rd,) 2005 (332nd) and 2007 (221st.)

On Sunday, May 4, 2008, he won the Full Tilt Poker 750k guaranteed for $132,788 beating a 3600+ player field.

As of 2009, his total live tournament winnings exceed $270,000.

Hilger has recently stopped being a professional poker and now works an office job at PokerStars on the Isle of Man.

Personal life

Outside of poker, Hilger enjoys composing music on the piano.  He is also a big supporter of the Colombian children's charity COLOMBIANITOS, having served on the board of directors until 2009.

External links
Internet Texas Holdem
Card Player articles
Hendon Mob tournament results

American poker players
Living people
Year of birth missing (living people)
American gambling writers
American male non-fiction writers
University of Georgia alumni
Georgia State University alumni
Thunderbird School of Global Management alumni